Where Sleeping Dogs Lie is a 1991 American neo noir thriller film directed by Charles Finch and starring Dylan McDermott. The primary location for the film was C.E. Toberman Estate in Hollywood, a large Mediterranean-style, 22-room house built at the top of Camino Palmero in 1928 by C. E. Toberman.

Plot
A murder mystery writer misreads the nervous man he bullies in a spooky Hollywood mansion. A psychological thriller with an aspiring writer who was recently evicted moves into a run down California mansion; an enigmatic tenant collaborates on his novel as the "real" killer of the family that the writer is writing about.  The writer does not like writing about "blood and guts" to have a best-seller; yet, desperation finds him moving into a house where the inhabitants were murdered by a serial killer, still-at-large, the "real killer" moves into the house as a tenant, helps write the book, then reveals that he killed the family.

Cast
 Dylan McDermott as Bruce Simmons
 Charles Finch as Evan Best  
 Sharon Stone as Serena Black
 Ron Karabatsos as Stan Reeb
 Tom Sizemore as Eddie Hale
 Mary Woronov as Woman Tourist
 David Q Combs as  man Tourist
 Vanna Bonta as Serena's Secretary 
 Elizabeth Whitcraft as Serena's Secretary (as Liza Whitcraft)
 Phoebe Stone as Little Girl 
 Shawne Rowe as Telegram Clown
 Richard Zavaglia as Detective Clifton 
 Jillian McWhirter as Dol Whitney
 Brett Cullen as JOhn Whitney

See also
 List of American films of 1991

References

External links

1991 films
1990s English-language films
1991 crime thriller films
Films scored by Hans Zimmer
Films scored by Mark Mancina
American crime thriller films
1990s American films